The 2001–02 Northern Counties East Football League season was the 20th in the history of Northern Counties East Football League, a football competition in England.

Premier Division

The Premier Division featured 18 clubs which competed in the previous season, along with two new clubs, promoted from Division One:
Borrowash Victoria
Pickering Town

League table

Division One

Division One featured 14 clubs which competed in the previous season, along with two new clubs:
Lincoln Moorlands, joined from the Central Midlands League
Staveley Miners Welfare, relegated from the Premier Division

League table

References

External links
 Northern Counties East Football League

2001-02
8